The Aiguille des Glaciers (3,816 m) is a mountain in the Mont Blanc massif of the Graian Alps. It lies on the borders of Savoie and Haute-Savoie in France and Aosta Valley in Italy.

A fine pyramidal peak when seen to the south from the Italian side, Aiguille des Glaciers dominates the view from the upper Veny Valley, although it is less distinct from its French side. It is usually climbed from  the Vallee des Glaciers in Savoie. The view from its summit is one of the best in the entire area.

On 1 November 1946 a B-17 Flying Fortress of the US Airforce crashed into the Aiguille des Glaciers, just 66 meters before the summit of Mont Blanc, killing all 8 crew members.

See also
 List of mountains of the Alps

References

Alpine three-thousanders
Mountains of Savoie
Mountains of Haute-Savoie
Mountains of Aosta Valley
France–Italy border
International mountains of Europe
Mountains of the Graian Alps
Mont Blanc massif